The San Francisco Municipal Railway (Muni) is the primary public transit system for San Francisco, California. Muni is part of the San Francisco Municipal Transportation Agency, which is also responsible for the streets, parking, traffic signals, and other transportation in the city. In 2019, Muni had the eighth-highest ridership among systems in the United States, with an average weekday ridership of 684,600. Service is operated to all parts of San Francisco - including Treasure Island - as well as small sections of Daly City and Marin County.

Muni operates seven light rail lines in the Muni Metro system, two streetcar lines (E Embarcadero and F Market & Wharves), and three cable car lines. Daytime bus service includes 44 local routes, 5 limited-stop "Rapid" routes, and 15 peak-hour express routes. Four additional express routes provide weekend service to the Marin Headlands, service to Oracle Park (home of the San Francisco Giants), and the Chase Center (home of the Golden State Warriors) and supplement BART in the early morning. Overnight night bus "Owl" service - part of the All Nighter network - includes eight 24-hour routes, two night-only routes, three bus replacements of Muni Metro lines, and five-weekend early-morning Muni Metro replacement lines. Fourteen local routes (two only at certain times), one rapid route, and four Owl routes run as electric trolleybuses. Muni service operates out of ten yards and garages: one cable car barn, three light rail/streetcar yards, two trolleybus garages, and four bus garages.

Routes have two-part names like "19 Polk" and "N Judah", where the second portion is usually a street served by the route (or in some cases, a neighborhood or landmark). Light rail and streetcar lines are lettered, while bus routes are numbered. The letter/number scheme was created by Muni, while the two-part naming scheme was created by the Market Street Railway, which Muni absorbed in 1944. The three cable car lines are largely known by name (Powell-Mason, Powell-Hyde, and California), though they are abbreviated to PM, PH, and C on maps, and have internal numbers 59–61 for operational purposes.

Muni began service on December 28, 1912, when the A Geary-Park line was inaugurated, running between the Financial District and the Richmond District on the western side of the city. The streetcar system was expanded over the next 16 years, including the Stockton Street Tunnel in 1914, Twin Peaks Tunnel in 1918 and the Sunset Tunnel in 1928. Muni began operating buses in 1917, and trolleybuses in 1941. The city acquired the competing Market Street Railway in 1944, doubling the size of Muni; its purchase of the bankrupt California Street Cable Railroad in 1952 made it the city's sole transit operator. Replacement of streetcars by buses in the 1940s and 1950s left only five streetcar lines; they were converted to Muni Metro light rail in 1980 with the completion of the Market Street subway. Numerous service changes over the lifetime of Muni gave rise to the lines in use today; a number of other lines have been discontinued.

During the COVID-19 pandemic, service was initially reduced to a limited set of "core service" routes, then gradually expanded. , six Muni Metro routes, one streetcar route, one bus replacement for a Muni Metro route, three cable car routes, 43 local bus routes, four Rapid routes, and three express routes are in operation. Several of those routes have been temporarily modified. Twelve overnight Owl routes and one early-morning express route are in operation.

Cable car lines 

All three cable car lines are based out of the cable car barn at Mason and Washington.

Muni Metro and historic streetcar lines 

Muni runs six Muni Metro light rail lines (J, K, L, M, N, and T), plus a shuttle service (S). The S Shuttle operates as an additional subway service at peak hours; extended S service is also used to serve events at Oracle Park (primarily San Francisco Giants games) and Chase Center (primarily Golden State Warriors games).

Two streetcar lines (E and F) use historic streetcars but serve as full transit routes rather than mere tourist attractions. Muni Metro lines are based out of two yards, Green Division (located at Balboa Park station) and Muni Metro East; the historic streetcar lines are based at Cameron Beach Yard (also near Balboa Park).

All routes except the E Embarcadero and L Taraval are in operation; bus replacements operate for the L Taraval.

Local bus lines 

Muni operates 44 local bus routes. Most routes operate on weekdays and weekends; the 41 and 88 operate only during weekday peak hours. A number of routes have different terminals during evenings and/or weekends. Route 2, which uses diesel hybrid buses, is supplemented by short turn trolleybuses at peak hours. Route 5 uses trolleybuses only during evenings and weekends.

Rapid bus lines 

On five high-ridership corridors, local buses are supplemented with rapid buses with limited stops. The Rapid routes largely follow the route of the local buses, with some variations; at times when the 5R and 9R operate, the 5 and 9 are cut back to a shorter route. The 5R, 9R, and 28R operate only on weekdays until 7pm; the 14R and 38R operate every day until 7pm.

Express bus lines 

Muni operates several types of express routes. Twelve routes operate between outer neighborhoods and downtown. The local sections in the outer neighborhoods overlap with local routes of the same number, while the non-stop express sections operate on expressways or major arterials. They operate only during weekday peak hours, with service only in the peak direction. Buses in the opposite direction run deadhead except for the 8AX and 8BX, which are paired with the local route 8 in the non-peak direction. Eight of the express routes are paired into 'A' and 'B' types, which have different local segments on the same corridor. All express routes except routes 1X, 8AX, 8BX, and 78X are suspended during the COVID-19 pandemic.

Three express routes provide specialized service. The 76X, which runs only on weekends and holidays, provides service to recreational and tourist areas in the Marin Headlands. The 78X and 79X provide service to the Chase Center; they run only before and after events at the arena. 

Three additional routes provide shorter-distance express service between the Caltrain commuter rail terminal at 4th and King station and business areas near Market Street. Like the outer express routes, they operate only at peak hours. The 81X and 82X operate only in the peak direction (the 81X operates only in the morning peak); the 83X has bidirectional service.

Owl bus lines 

Owl routes provide night bus service from 1am to 5am daily (including holidays) as a part of the Bay Area's All Nighter network.

The 90 Owl route is a combination of the daytime 47 Van Ness and 9 San Bruno routes, while the 91 Owl route is a combination of the daytime K Ingleside, 8 Bayshore, T Third, 30 Stockton, and 28 19th Avenue routes. The 5 Fulton, 24 Divisadero, 44 O'Shaughnessy, and 48 Quintara-24th Street Owl routes are truncated from their daytime counterparts. 

Route 714 is part of the Early Bird Express system, which provides service while BART performs seismic retrofit earthquake work in the Transbay Tube. It runs a limited number of trips during the early morning between 4am and 5am, while BART is closed.

The K, L, and N Owl motor coaches replace daytime light rail service and run on surface streets, making local stops, rather than in the Market Street subway, Twin Peaks Tunnel, and Sunset Tunnel. The L Owl also covers the route of the daytime F-Market line. The L and N Owl buses run all night, while the K Owl runs only a small number of trips in the early morning and just after the subway closes.

Early morning lines 
In addition to the Owl service, buses normally provide weekend service along all Muni Metro lines from 5am until rail service begins (6am on Saturdays, 8am on Sundays) to allow for overnight maintenance work in the subway. The K, L, and N Bus routes differ slightly from the nightly Owl routes and do not make local stops along their surface street detours, instead stopping only at stops used by the normal L and N daytime light rail routes. Several of the early morning routes are suspended, while the L bus operates the same shortened route as the daytime bus.

References

External links 
SFMTA - Muni Routes & Stops

San Francisco Municipal Railway
Muni
Muni
San Francisco Municipal Railway
San Francisco